Arantxa Parra Santonja (born 9 November 1982) is a Spanish former professional tennis player. She turned pro in 2000 and retired in 2019.

In her career, Parra Santonja won eleven doubles titles on the WTA Tour. She reached career-high rankings of world No. 46 in singles and 22 in doubles.

Significant finals

Premier Mandatory/Premier 5 finals

Doubles: 1 (runner-up)

WTA career finals

Singles: 2 (2 runner-ups)

Doubles: 27 (11 titles, 16 runner-ups)

ITF Circuit finals

Singles: 17 (11–6)

Doubles: 20 (9–11)

Grand Slam performance timelines

Singles

Doubles

External links

 
 
 
 
 
 
 

1982 births
Living people
Sportspeople from Valencia
Spanish female tennis players
Tennis players at the 2012 Summer Olympics
Tennis players at the 2016 Summer Olympics
Olympic tennis players of Spain
Tennis players from the Valencian Community